Jack William Shutt (born 24 June 1997) is an English cricketer. He made his Twenty20 debut on 25 July 2019, for Yorkshire in the 2019 t20 Blast. He made his first-class debut on 1 August 2020, for Yorkshire in the 2020 Bob Willis Trophy. He made his List A debut on 22 July 2021, for Yorkshire in the 2021 Royal London One-Day Cup.

References

External links
 

1997 births
Living people
English cricketers
Yorkshire cricketers
Cricketers from Barnsley
English cricketers of the 21st century